The 1987 Indian vice-presidential election was held in mid-1987 to elect Vice-President of India, after the incumbent R. Venkataraman's resignation following his election as President. Shankar Dayal Sharma was declared elected unopposed on the final day of registration, 21 August 1987. Had the election been contested by more than one candidate, it would have occurred on 7 September 1987.

Schedule
The election schedule was announced by the Election Commission of India on 4 August 1952.

Result
The Electoral College consisted of 790 members of Lok Sabha and Rajya Sabha. There were 27 candidates who filed their nominations. The Returning Officer rejected the nomination of 26 of them after scrutiny, deeming that only the nomination of Shankar Dayal Sharma was valid. Since he was now the only candidate left, Shankar Dayal Sharma was declared as elected unopposed to the office of the Vice-President on 25 April 1952. He was sworn in to the office on 9 September 1987.

See also
 1987 Indian presidential election

References

Vice-presidential elections in India
India